John Puleston may refer to:
 John Puleston (judge) (c. 1583–1659), Welsh barrister and judge
 John Puleston (MP, died 1551) (by 1492–1551), Welsh politician, MP for Caernarvon Boroughs, and for Caernarvonshire 
 Sir John Henry Puleston (1830–1908), Welsh journalist, entrepreneur and politician, MP for Devonport